The cardinal electors in the 1939 papal conclave numbered 62 and all of them participated. They are arranged by region, and within each alphabetically.

Roman Curia
Tommaso Boggiani, OP, Chancellor of Apostolic Chancery
Camillo Caccia-Dominioni, Prefect of Pontifical Household
Nicola Canali, Assessor of Holy Office
Federico Cattani Amadori, Secretary of Apostolic Signatura
Enrico Gasparri, Prefect of Apostolic Signatura
Pietro Fumasoni Biondi, Prefect of Propagation of the Faith
Gennaro Granito Pignatelli di Belmonte, Dean of the College of Cardinals
Domenico Jorio, Prefect of Discipline of the Sacraments
Vincenzo Lapuma, Prefect of Religious
Lorenzo Lauri, Major Penitentiary
Luigi Maglione, Prefect of Council
Domenico Mariani, Provost of the Administration of the Wealth of the Holy See
Giovanni Mercati, Librarian of Vatican Library, Archivist of Vatican Secret Archives
Eugenio Pacelli, Secretary of State, Camerlengo (was elected Pope and chose the name Pius XII)
Raffaele Rossi, OCD, Secretary of Consistorial
Carlo Salotti, Prefect of Rites
Donato Sbarretti, Secretary of Holy Office
Federico Tedeschini, Datary of His Holiness
Eugène-Gabriel-Gervais-Laurent Tisserant, Secretary of Oriental Churches (origin: France)
Alessandro Verde, Secretary of Rites

Europe

Italy
Alessio Ascalesi, CPPS, Archbishop of Naples
Pietro Boetto, SJ, Archbishop of Genoa
Elia Dalla Costa, Archbishop of Florence
Carlo Cremonesi, Territorial Prelate Emeritus of Pompei
Angelo Dolci, Archpriest of St. John Lateran Basilica
Maurilio Fossati, OSsCGN, Archbishop of Turin
Luigi Lavitrano, Archbishop of Palermo
Francesco Marchetti-Selvaggiani, Vicar General of Rome
Francesco Marmaggi, Nuncio to Poland
Massimo Massimi, President of Codification of Oriental Canon Law
Giovanni Nasalli Rocca di Corneliano, Archbishop of Bologna
Ermenegildo Pellegrinetti, Nuncio Emeritus to Yugoslavia
Adeodato Giovanni Piazza, OCD, Patriarch of Venice
Giuseppe Pizzardo, Secretary of Extraordinary Ecclesiastical Affairs
Alfredo Ildefonso Schuster, OSB, Archbishop of Milan
Enrico Sibilia, Nuncio to Austria

France
Alfred-Henri-Marie Baudrillart, IOSFN, Rector of Institut Catholique de Paris
Pierre-Marie Gerlier, Archbishop of Lyon
Achille Liénart, Bishop of Lille
Emmanuel Célestin Suhard, Archbishop of Reims
Jean Verdier, PSS, Archbishop of Paris

Germany
Adolf Bertram, Archbishop of Breslau
Michael von Faulhaber, Archbishop of Munich and Freising
Karl Joseph Schulte, Archbishop of Cologne

Spain
Francisco Vidal y Barraquer, Archbishop of Tarragona
Isidro Goma y Tomas, Archbishop of Toledo
Pedro Segura y Sáenz, Archbishop of Seville

Austria
Theodor Innitzer, Archbishop of Vienna

Belgium
Jozef-Ernest van Roey, Archbishop of Mechelen

Czechoslovakia
Karel Kašpar, Archbishop of Prague

Hungary
Jusztinián György Serédi, OSB, Archbishop of Esztergom

Poland
August Hlond, SDB, Archbishop of Gniezno and Poznań

Portugal
Manuel Gonçalves Cerejeira, Patriarch of Lisbon

United Kingdom and Ireland
Arthur Hinsley, Archbishop of Westminster (England, United Kingdom)
Joseph MacRory, Archbishop of Armagh (archdiocese contained territory in both Ireland/Éire and Northern Ireland)

North America

United States
Dennis Joseph Dougherty, Archbishop of Philadelphia
William Henry O'Connell, Archbishop of Boston
George Mundelein, Archbishop of Chicago

Canada
Jean-Marie-Rodrigue Villeneuve, OMI, Archbishop of Quebec

South America

Argentina
Santiago Copello, Archbishop of Buenos Aires

Brazil
Sebastião da Silveira Cintra, Archbishop of Rio de Janeiro

Asia

Syria
Ignatius Gabriel I Tappuni, Patriarch of Antioch of the Syrians (Cardinal Tappuni was born in Mosul, located in modern-day Iraq)

References
, with titles and photographs, in order of precedence

1939 elections 
1939 elections in Europe 
Pope Pius XI
1939 papal conclave
1939